is a Japanese comedy manga series by Gaku Kuze. It has been serialized online via Ichijinsha's Comic POOL digital manga magazine since May 2017. Chapters have been collected in six tankōbon volumes. The manga series has been licensed in North America by Kodansha USA. An anime television series adaptation produced by Studio Blanc aired from July to September 2021.

Synopsis

Uramichi Omota, a 31-year-old former professional gymnast, works as the leader of the exercise segment of the children's show Together with Maman (a parody of Okaasan to Issho). Despite keeping an upbeat personality on the show, he can't help but reveal his jaded, worn-out personality.

Characters

The Gymnastic Onii-san of children's show Together with Maman, he is usually simply called "Uramichi Onii-san." Uramichi is a 31-year old former gymnast who is physically well built with a refreshing smile, but is actually mentally unstable. Despite keeping an upbeat personality on the show, he can't help but reveal his jaded, worn-out personality, often telling the children the sorrows of being adults. He is a smoker and heavy drinker, and his only hobby is muscle training, but hates this being pointed out.

Tobikichi is a 28-year-old man who plays a rabbit mascot called "Usao" in Together with Maman. Along with Mitsuo, he was Uramichi's junior in college. As a running gag, he is often caught about to bad-mouth Uramichi.

Mitsuo is a 28-year old man who works under a bear costume called "Kumao" in Together with Maman. Along with Tobikichi, he was Uramichi's junior during college. Kumatani has a soft spot for Iketeru, often protecting him from pranks.

The "Singing Onii-san" of Together with Maman who is also a former musical actor. Despite being good-looking, Iketeru loves dirty jokes and is apparently unable to read analog watches. Although he can be dense he possesses a lot of hidden skills such as acting ability, drawing and ping pong. 

A 32-year old "Singing Onee-san" of Together with Maman. Utano is an elite graduate of a music college, but due to bad luck and timing she keeps changing jobs from idol, enka singer, and jazz singer. She is currently living together with her boyfriend of 6 years, who is an unpopular comedian.

(Japanese); Johnny Yong Bosch (English)

Media

Manga
Life Lessons with Uramichi Oniisan is written and illustrated by Gaku Kuze. It has been serialized online in Ichijinsha's Comic POOL digital manga magazine since May 12, 2017. Chapters have been collected in seven tankōbon volumes. During their Anime NYC 2019 panel, Kodansha USA announced that they had licensed the series.

Volume list

Anime
An anime adaptation was announced in a promotional video of the fourth volume of the manga on October 25, 2019. The television series is animated by Studio Blanc and directed by Nobuyoshi Nagayama, with Touko Machida handling series composition, Mizuki Takahashi and Yusuke Shibata designing the characters, and Kei Haneoka composing the series' music. It was scheduled to premiere in 2020, but was delayed to 2021 due to "production issues". The series aired from July 6 to September 28, 2021, on TV Tokyo and other channels. Mamoru Miyano and Nana Mizuki performed the opening theme song, "ABC Taisō" (ABC Exercises) as their respective characters, while Miyano also performed the ending theme song "Dream on". Funimation licensed the series. Following Sony's acquisition of Crunchyroll, the series was moved to Crunchyroll.

Episode list

Reception
In 2017, the manga won the Next Manga Award in the web manga category. Rebecca Silverman of Anime News Network published a positive review of the two omnibus editions of the manga in 2021. She wrote that: "Simply put, Life Lessons with Uramichi Oniisan works because it melds absurdity with a dash of realism while reminding readers of their own experiences with children's programming. It does take a while to get going, but by the end of the second book, it has achieved just the right mix of humor and cynicism."

The anime adaptation's first episode garnered mixed reviews from Anime News Network's staff during the Summer 2021 season previews. Richard Eisenbeis praised the portrayal of Uramichi being more "depressed and disillusioned than [as] an asshole" and the treatment of the other characters' predicament being "equal parts funny and sad", saying that fans of Sayonara, Zetsubou-Sensei will enjoy this series. Caitlin Moore was critical of the inappropriate humor said towards young children and the comic timing being "a little bit off" and diminishing the impact of the jokes. James Beckett felt the show didn't "play[s] up the absurdity of its central joke enough" to offset the lack of other jokes throughout the runtime, despite giving praise to the "understated" delivery and Mamoru Miyano giving a "naturalistic" performance as Iketeru. Lynzee Loveridge wrote that the series will appeal to people who enjoy its brand of dark humor, saying that: "If you find this funny, it also probably says something about you and your personal life experiences, your outlook on the world at large." Silverman found the early parts of the episode unfunny because of the focus on Uramichi's bleak outlook but was hopeful of his supporting cast balancing the humor, concluding that: "[T]he contrasts between the colors of the show and Uramichi's dark moments are good, and I like the vocal cast's delivery, but I'm having a hard time getting behind this episode in general. It does get better, but getting there could be a schlep." Nicholas Dupree said that despite a few gags landing its spot, he felt the premiere was hampered by its structure of shorter segments undercutting Uramichi's comments and lacking in quality punchlines, concluding that: "It's a pity, because this past year has had me in the mood for darker humor more than ever, but so far Uramichi Oniisan just hasn't delivered."

Silverman reviewed the complete anime series in 2022 and gave it a B– grade. While finding fault in the "limited animation", the portrayals of Derekida and Capellini, and the limited appeal of its central premise, she praised Uramichi and Together with Mamans programming for making up "a winning combination" for one of the series' best jokes, the "solid vocal performances" from the cast and the subtle details in the characters' past and background jokes, concluding that: "I do think it may work a bit better in its original manga form, but no matter how you experience it, this is probably a love-it-or-hate-it kind of show." The series was nominated for Best Comedy at the 6th Crunchyroll Anime Awards, but lost to Komi Can't Communicate.

Notes

References

External links
  
  
 

2021 anime television series debuts
Anime series based on manga
Dark comedy anime and manga
Crunchyroll anime
Ichijinsha manga
Japanese webcomics
Josei manga
Studio Blanc
TV Tokyo original programming
Webcomics in print